The Prison Act 1877 (40 & 41 Vict c 21) was an Act of the Parliament of the United Kingdom of Great Britain and Ireland that aimed to alter the way in which British prisons were operated.

Detail
By the 19th century, concerns had been raised about the uncoordinated and incoherent nature of the prison system in Britain. Many gaols were operated by local authorities, to a varying degree of quality. The Prison Act 1865 had increased central controls over these prisons, but local practices continued to vary widely.

In 1877, Parliament took the major step of enacting a long-standing proposal to centralise the running of British prisons.

The Home Secretary was given powers over the new structure, which was delegated in the act to the new Board of Prison Commissioners, supported by an inspectorate and central staff. Further legislation was not felt necessary until 1895.

See also
Prison Act

Bibliography
Anderson, Robert. The Prison Acts of 1877 and 1865. London. 1878. Catalogue.
Fox, Lionel. (2001) The English Prison and Borstal Systems: an account of the prison and Borstal systems. London: Routledge. .
Wilkinson, Robert. The Law of Prisons in England and Wales, being the Prison Act, 1865 (28 & 29 Vict. c. 126), and the Prison Act, 1877 (40 & 41 Vict. c. 21). Knight & Co. Fleet Street, London. 1878. Google Books Internet Archive.

Notes

References

United Kingdom Acts of Parliament 1877
1877 in British law